29 Acacia Avenue is a play by Denis and Mabel Constanduros. Its 1945 British comedy-drama film adaptation, directed by Henry Cass, was released in the U.S. as The Facts of Love.

Premise
Peter Robinson falls in love with the naïve country girl Fay and the worldly, wealthy and already-married Joan, and lives with them both (and Joan's husband) at his parents' house.  However, one day Peter's parents unexpectedly return from holiday, and all hell breaks loose.

Cast
Gordon Harker as Mr. Robinson
Betty Balfour as Mrs. Robinson
Jimmy Hanley as Peter Robinson
Carla Lehmann as Fay
Hubert Gregg as Michael
Jill Evans as Joan
Henry Kendall as Mr. Wilson
Dinah Sheridan as Pepper
Megs Jenkins as Shirley
Noele Gordon as Mrs. Wilson
Guy Middleton as Gerald
Aubrey Mallalieu as Martin

Critical reception
Allmovie wrote, "one of the few low-budget British programmers to enjoy a reasonably widespread American release...The film weaves three separate romantic subplots into an entertaining unified whole"; though Sky Movies called the film "one wartime West End success that didn't transfer too well to screen, ending up embarrassingly stagey"; but the Radio Times thought that although the film "fails to fully disguise its theatrical origins...it nevertheless makes for pleasant period entertainment, with particularly likeable performances from British veterans Gordon Harker and Betty Balfour as the parents."

References

External links

English plays
1945 films
1945 comedy-drama films
British comedy-drama films
Films directed by Henry Cass
Films set in London
Films set in Sussex
Films produced by Sydney Box
Columbia Pictures films
British black-and-white films
1940s British films